X is the fifth studio album by Indonesian singer Agnez Mo. It was released on 10 October 2017. The album was mostly produced by Danja. Despite having released two singles, “Coke Bottle” and “Boy Magnet”, both tracks were omitted from her international debut album.

Singles
 "Long As I Get Paid", released on 20 September 2017
 "Damn I Love You", released on 26 October 2017
 "Wanna Be Loved", released on 22 October 2019

Music videos
The music video for "Long As I Get Paid", released 20 September 2017, features  Agnes wearing a dress heavily influenced by Indonesian traditional-clothing aesthetics. The video reached 1.3 million views in 24 hours. 
On 26 October 2017, the music video for "Damn I Love You" was released.
On 22 October 2019, the music video for "Wanna Be Loved" was released.

Track listing

References

Agnez Mo albums
2017 albums